Cobalt(II) acetate is the cobalt salt of acetic acid. It is commonly found as the tetrahydrate Co(CH3CO2)2·4 H2O, abbreviated Co(OAc)2·4 H2O. It is used as a catalyst.

Synthesis and structure
Like many other transition metal acetates, cobalt(II) acetate forms by the reaction of cobalt oxide or hydroxide and acetic acid:
 CoO + 2CH3CO2H  +  3H2O   →   Co(CH3CO2)2·4 H2O
The tetrahydrate has been shown by X-ray crystallography to adopt an octahedral structure, the central cobalt centre being coordinated by four water molecules and two acetate ligands. The analogous nickel acetate is isostructural.

Various hydrates are known including Co(CH3CO2)2·H2O and [Co(CH3CO2)2]5·0.5 H2O.

Reactions and uses
Cobalt acetate is a precursor to various oil drying agents, catalysts that allow paints and varnishes to harden.

Anhydrous cobalt acetate is a widely used source of cobalt in the synthesis of materials, catalyst, and complexes.

Safety
Cobalt salts are poisonous.

References

Acetates
Cobalt(II) compounds